Evansiana is a jazz album by a quartet with Paul McCandless, John Taylor, Pierluigi Balducci and Michele Rabbia. The album is an anthology of compositions by the pianist Bill Evans. It was released in February 2017 by the Italian label Dodicilune.

Track listing

Personnel 
Paul McCandless – soprano sax, oboe (track 2), bass clarinet (7)
John Taylor – piano
Pierluigi Balducci – electric bass
Michele Rabbia – drums, percussion

References 

2017 albums